Perati is a small settlement near Livek in the Municipality of Kobarid in the Littoral region of Slovenia.

History
Perati was a hamlet of Avsa until 1997, when it was administratively separated and made a settlement in its own right.

References

External links
Perati on Geopedia

Populated places in the Municipality of Kobarid